Bequest Life Insurance is a privately owned British fintech life insurance company headquartered in the United Kingdom. It operates under two insurance licenses: life and wills. Bequest is regulated by the Financial Conduct Authority and is one of the earliest of a number of new app-based insurance providers in the UK.

History

Bequest was founded by James Buckley-Thorp in 2019. Its head office is located in London, England, United Kingdom. Bequest is backed by both Aviva and Covea and provides life insurance, wills, and estate planning to consumers. In 2021, the company raised just over £1.7m in investment from Clocktower Ventures, Kuvi Capital, and Form Ventures.

References

Financial services companies based in the City of London
Life insurance companies of the United Kingdom
Aviva